scikit-image (formerly scikits.image) is an open-source image processing library for the Python programming language.
It includes algorithms for segmentation, geometric transformations, color space manipulation, analysis, filtering, morphology, feature detection, and more.  It is designed to interoperate with the Python numerical and scientific libraries NumPy and SciPy.

Overview
The scikit-image project started as scikits.image, by Stéfan van der Walt. Its name stems from the notion that it is a "SciKit" (SciPy Toolkit), a separately-developed and distributed third-party extension to SciPy. 
The original codebase was later extensively rewritten by other developers. Of the various scikits, scikit-image as well as scikit-learn were described as "well-maintained and popular" .  Scikit-image has also been active in the Google Summer of Code.

Implementation
scikit-image is largely written in Python, with some core algorithms written in Cython to achieve performance.

References

External links
 
 https://github.com/scikit-image/scikit-image

Image processing software
Python (programming language) scientific libraries
Software using the BSD license